CLIA may refer to:

 Chemiluminescent immunoassay
 Clinical Laboratory Improvement Amendments
 Cruise Lines International Association